Honing railway station was a station in Norfolk, England, serving the small village of Honing. It was on the Midland and Great Northern Joint Railway between Melton Constable and Great Yarmouth. It closed along with the rest of the line in 1959.

Today, the two platforms and remains of the waiting room and its cellar, complete with two fireplaces survive, along with remains of the station building foundations, the signal box, and a hand water pump inside a small shed. Alongside the waiting room side platform is lattice fencing typical of M&GN stations.

The station site is currently being worked on by the Norfolk Railway Heritage Group in conjunction with the Norfolk County Council to expose and preserve the remains.

On 29 June 2019 the formation between the platforms was temporarily relaid, and 7¼" gauge passenger services were operated by the Barton House Railway.

Signal box
The signal box located to the east of the station has been preserved at the Barton House Railway (BHR) in Wroxham.

References

Honing, Norfolk
Disused railway stations in Norfolk
Former Midland and Great Northern Joint Railway stations
Railway stations in Great Britain opened in 1882
Railway stations in Great Britain closed in 1959
1882 establishments in England
1959 disestablishments in England